In the 1903 Tour de France, in contrast to modern stage races, a cyclist who gave up during a stage was allowed to start again the next stage, although he would no longer be in contention for the general classification. Thus Hippolyte Aucouturier, who gave up during the first stage, was able to return, and won the second and third stages. Charles Laeser, winner of the fourth stage, had not completed the third stage.

60 cyclists, all professionals or semi-professionals, started the race, of whom 49 were French, 4 Belgian, 4 Swiss, 2 German, and one Italian; 21 of them were sponsored by bicycle manufacturers, while 39 entered without commercial support. 24 other cyclists took advantage of the opportunity to enter specific stages: one rode in both the second and fourth stages, and additionally three cyclists took part in the second stage, one in the third stage, fifteen in the fourth stage only, and a further four only competed in the fifth stage.

By starting number

By nationality
The number of stage wins and winners in the table below is incomplete.

References

1903 Tour de France
1903